Günther Weißenborn (2 June 1911 – 25 February 2001) was a German classical pianist, accompanist, conductor and academic teacher.

Awards 

 1976: Order of Merit of the Federal Republic of Germany

External links 

 

German classical pianists
Male classical pianists
German male conductors (music)
1911 births
2001 deaths
Academic staff of the Hochschule für Musik Detmold
20th-century classical pianists
Officers Crosses of the Order of Merit of the Federal Republic of Germany
20th-century German conductors (music)
20th-century German male musicians